Acacia lacertensis is a tree belonging to the genus Acacia and the subgenus Juliflorae that is endemic to tropical parts of northern central Australia.

Description
It blooms from June to July producing yellow flowers. It has stout angular branchlets that are glabrous with a powdery white coating. The phyllodes have two to three prominent fine longitudinal nerves that are widely spaced. The flower-spikes are found occurring in pairs and are found on shoots located on the upper axils.

It is closely related to Acacia tropica which is found further to the east in the Gulf Country.

Distribution
The species is found in northern parts of the Northern Territory on the north western edges of the Arnhemland sandstone plateau. It is found in parts of the East Alligator River and its tributaries including Cooper Creek in Kakadu National Park where it grows along creek lines in sandy soils.

See also
 List of Acacia species

References

lacertensis
Flora of the Northern Territory
Plants described in 1999
Taxa named by Leslie Pedley